Rodeo Tandem Beat Specter is an album by Thee Michelle Gun Elephant, released in 2001.

Track listing 
 "CITROËN NO KODOKU (The Loneliness of The Citroën)" – 5:42
 "Alligator Night" – 3:07
 "ABAKARETA SEKAI (The World Exposed)" – 3:44
 "God Jazz Time" – 5:00
 "Baby Stardust" – 3:17
 "Rita" – 4:22
 "Beat Specter Buchanan" – 2:17
 "Mona Lisa" – 6:28
 "Turkey" – 3:43
 "BREAK HAZURETA ORENO SHINZOU (My Heart With Its Brakes Broken Loose)" – 3:02
 "Margaret" – 4:04
 "Bird Land Cindy" – 3:46
 "Beat Specter Garcia" – 1:57
 "The Redhead Kelly" – 5:40

Thee Michelle Gun Elephant albums
2001 albums